Abel Guier is the bass guitarist for the Costa Rican music group Gandhi and Mimayato.

Abel joined Gandhi in 1996, before the recording of their first album El Jardín del Corazón.  He knew the rest of the band from their highschool years.  He began playing bass at age 16, inspired by Steve Harris from Iron Maiden and Cliff Burton from Metallica.  From the beginning he liked the bass, but mostly he wanted to write as a way of expression.

References 

1972 births
Bass guitarists
Rock songwriters
Living people
Costa Rican guitarists
People from San José, Costa Rica
21st-century bass guitarists